Live in Warsaw is the first live album by IAMX, released on 14 November 2008 through record company 61seconds. The album was originally only to be released in Poland (under exclusive license to Vision Film), however it was made available worldwide by an online retailer. The album is now out of print. It was available as a digital download. On 26 June 2020 the digital download version was re-released .

The performance was recorded on 29 July 2007 at the Agnieszka Osiecka Music Studio of Polish Radio, in front of a live audience for Polskie Radio Program III. The album was mixed in Berlin at IAMX2 studios.

 Lyrics on Tracks 6, 9 and 10 co-written/written by Ian Pickering.
 Lyrics on Track 9 co-written by Liam Howe.

References

IAMX albums
2008 live albums